USC may refer to:

Education

United States
 Universidad del Sagrado Corazón, Santurce, Puerto Rico
 University of South Carolina, Columbia, South Carolina
 University of South Carolina System, the university system of South Carolina
 University of Southern California, Los Angeles, California
 University of Southern Colorado, Pueblo, Colorado
 Upper St. Clair High School, Upper St. Clair, Pennsylvania
 Utica School of Commerce, a defunct business college in Utica, New York

Worldwide
 Shih Chien University, Taipei and Kaohsiung, Taiwan
 Sichuan University, Chengdu, China
 Ullapara Science College, Rajshahi Division, Bangladesh
 University of San Carlos, Cebu City, Philippines
 University of Santiago de Compostela, Santiago de Compostela, Spain
 University of Science and Culture, Tehran, Iran
 University Senior College, a year 11 and 12 school in Adelaide, South Australia
 University of South China, Hengyang, China
 University of the Southern Caribbean, Maracas Valley, Trinidad and Tobago
 University of the Sunshine Coast, Queensland, Australia

Government
 United Somali Congress (1987–2004), a former major rebel organization
 United States Code, the official code of United States federal law
 United States Congress, the law-making body of the United States government
 Universal Social Charge, an income tax in Ireland
 Utility Stores Corporation, a Pakistani state-owned store chain

Law enforcement
 Ulster Special Constabulary, a former reserve police force in Northern Ireland
 United States Constabulary (1946–1952), the security force of the U.S. Occupation Zone of West Germany

Sports
 UEFA Super Cup, an annual association football super cup match
 United Soccer Coaches, a United States organization
 United SportsCar Championship, a racing series in the United States and Canada
 Unity Sporting Club, an association football (soccer) club in Wenchi, Ghana
 USC Lion Soccer Club, an association football (soccer) club in Adelaide, Australia, playing in the South Australian Amateur Soccer League

Miscellaneous
 USC (clothing retailer), in the United Kingdom
 USC Canada,  a Unitarian development organization promoting agricultural biodiversity
 Heckler & Koch USC, a semiautomatic submachine gun
 Ubuntu Software Center, a discontinued software management system
 Uchinoura Space Center, a JAXA space vehicle launch facility
 Unified Soil Classification System, used in engineering and geology
 United Shipbuilding Corporation, in Russia
 United States customary units, a system of measurement
 WWE United States Championship, a wrestling event

See also
 Pontifical University of the Holy Cross, in Italy
 Unitarian Universalist Service Committee